The 117th United States Congress was a meeting of the legislative branch of the United States federal government, composed of the United States Senate and the United States House of Representatives. It convened in Washington, D.C., on January 3, 2021, during the final weeks of Donald Trump's presidency and the first two years of Joe Biden's presidency and ended on January 3, 2023.

The 2020 elections decided control of both chambers. In the House of Representatives, the Democratic Party retained their majority, albeit reduced from the 116th Congress. It is similar in size to the majority held by the Republican Party during the 83rd Congress (1953–1955).

In the Senate, Republicans briefly held the majority at the start. However, on January 20, 2021, three new Democratic senators (Jon Ossoff and Raphael Warnock of Georgia and Alex Padilla of California) were sworn in, resulting in 50 seats held by Republicans, 48 seats held by Democrats, and two held by independents who caucus with the Democrats. Effectively, this created a 50–50 split, which had not occurred since the 107th Congress in 2001. This was only the fourth time in U.S. history that the Senate has been evenly split, the first being in the 47th Congress (1881–1883), and the longest lasting one ever.

The new senators were sworn into office by Vice President Kamala Harris, just hours after her own inauguration. With Harris serving as the tie breaker in her constitutional role as President of the Senate, Democrats gained control of the Senate, and thereby full control of Congress for the first time since the 111th Congress ended in 2011. Additionally, with the inauguration of Joe Biden as president that same day, Democrats assumed control of the executive branch as well, attaining an overall federal government trifecta, also for the first time since the 111th Congress.

Despite Democrats holding only razor-thin majorities in both chambers during a period of intense political polarization, the 117th Congress is considered by political scientists to have been one of the most productive sessions of Congress in U.S. history. Some political scientists have described the legislative accomplishments of this congress as the most significant and sizable since those of the 89th Congress when President Lyndon B. Johnson passed many of his Great Society policies. Major policies enacted by the 117th Congress include the landmark Inflation Reduction Act, American Rescue Plan, Infrastructure Investment and Jobs Act, Postal Service Reform Act, Bipartisan Safer Communities Act, CHIPS and Science Act, Honoring Our PACT Act, Electoral Count Reform and Presidential Transition Improvement Act, and the Respect for Marriage Act.

Major events

 January 3, 2021: 117th Congress officially begins. Members-elect of the United States Senate and the United States House of Representatives are sworn in; though because of the COVID-19 pandemic, House members-elect did not all gather in the chamber to be sworn in, but rather, were summoned to the chambers in seven groups of about 72 people.
 January 5, 2021: Runoff elections were held in Georgia for the regular and special Senate elections, with Democrats winning both and gaining control of the Senate upon Kamala Harris's inauguration.
 January 6, 2021: A pro-Trump mob attacked the Capitol, halting the joint session to count and certify the Electoral College vote. By nightfall, the mob had been cleared and the vote counting resumed, with the certification being made official around 3:00a.m. on January 7.
 January 13, 2021: Second impeachment of Donald Trump: House impeached President Trump for inciting the January 6 attack on the Capitol.
 January 20, 2021: Joe Biden became President of the United States.
 January 20, 2021: With Vice President Kamala Harris's inauguration, alongside the seating of three new Democratic senators (Ossoff, Warnock, Padilla – the two Georgia runoff winners and Harris's appointed replacement), Democrats take control of the Senate with a 50–50 split and Harris as the tiebreaker in her role as Senate President.
 January 25, 2021: House Democrats formally send an article of impeachment against former president Donald Trump to the Senate.
 February 3, 2021: Senate organizing resolution passed, allowing Democrats to control committees and freshman senators to take committee appointments.
 February 9–13, 2021: Second impeachment trial of Donald Trump.
 April 2, 2021: April 2021 United States Capitol car attack
 April 13, 2021: Officer Billy Evans lies in state in the U.S. Capitol.
 April 28, 2021: President Biden addressed a joint session of Congress.
 May 12, 2021: House Republicans vote to oust Liz Cheney as conference chair for criticizing Donald Trump and opposing his attempts to reject the results of the 2020 election.
 May 14, 2021: Elise Stefanik is elected House Republican Conference chair.
 June 17, 2021: Juneteenth becomes the first newly created federal holiday since 1983.
 March 1, 2022: President Joe Biden delivered the 2022 State of the Union Address.
 March 21–24, 2022: Hearings are held on the nomination of Ketanji Brown Jackson to the Supreme Court.
 March 24, 2022: Nebraska Representative Jeff Fortenberry is convicted by a jury in the Central District of California of one count of scheming to falsify material facts and two counts of lying to federal investigators relating to an illegal donation made to his campaign in 2016 by Lebanese-Nigerian billionaire Gilbert Chagoury. He resigns from Congress.
 March 29, 2022: Don Young, representative for Alaska's at-large congressional district since 1973 and dean of the House of Representatives, lies in state in the U.S. Capitol, having died on March 18.
 April 7, 2022: The Senate confirmed Ketanji Brown Jackson to the United States Supreme Court.
 June 9, 2022: The House Special Select Committee investigating the January 6th Insurrection held the first of several summer hearings centered around the attack. 
 June 24, 2022: The United States Supreme Court overturns Roe v. Wade. 
 July 27, 2022: The Senate passed the CHIPS and Science Act.
 July 27, 2022: Senator Joe Manchin strikes a deal with Senate Majority Leader Chuck Schumer to resurrect some of President Joe Biden's climate, tax and healthcare agenda in the Inflation Reduction Act of 2022.
 July 28, 2022: The House passed the CHIPS and Science Act.
 July 31, 2022: U.S. drone strikes killed al-Qaeda leader Ayman al-Zawahiri.
 August 4, 2022: The Senate voted 95–1 in favor of ratifying the accession of Sweden and Finland into NATO.
 August 7, 2022: The Senate voted 51–50 to pass the Inflation Reduction Act, with Vice President Kamala Harris breaking the tie. 
 August 12, 2022: The House voted 220–207 to pass the Inflation Reduction Act.
 August 16, 2022: President Joe Biden signed the Inflation Reduction Act into law. 
 August 24, 2022: President Biden canceled up to $20,000 in student loan debt.
 September 13, 2022: With the swearing-in of Mary Peltola, for the first time Congress has indigenous representatives from Native Alaskan, Native American, and Native Hawaiian peoples.
 September 21, 2022: The Senate voted 69–27 to pass the Kigali Amendment.
 October 6, 2022: President Biden pardons all prior offenses of marijuana possession, and instructs Attorney General Merrick Garland and Secretary Xavier Becerra to reconsider how marijuana is scheduled under federal law.
 December 9, 2022: Democratic senator Kyrsten Sinema officially leaves the Democratic Party and becomes an independent.
 December 13, 2022: President Biden signs the Respect for Marriage Act into law, repealing the 1996 Defense of Marriage Act.
 December 29, 2022: President Biden signs the Consolidated Appropriations Act, 2023 into law, including several pieces of subsidiary legislation.

Major legislation

Enacted 

 March 11, 2021: American Rescue Plan Act of 2021, 
 March 31, 2021: PPP Extension Act, 
May 20, 2021: COVID-19 Hate Crimes Act, 
June 17, 2021: Juneteenth National Independence Day Act, 
October 27, 2021: Reinforcing Nicaragua's Adherence to Conditions for Electoral Reform (RENACER) Act, 
 November 15, 2021: Infrastructure Investment and Jobs Act, 
 December 22, 2021: Capitol Police Emergency Assistance Act, 
 December 23, 2021: Uyghur Forced Labor Prevention Act, 
 December 27, 2021: National Defense Authorization Act for Fiscal Year 2022, 
 March 15, 2022: Consolidated Appropriations Act, 2022 (including Violence Against Women Reauthorization Act), 
 March 29, 2022: Emmett Till Antilynching Act, 
 April 6, 2022: Postal Service Reform Act of 2022, 
 May 9, 2022: Ukraine Democracy Defense Lend-Lease Act of 2022, 
 June 25, 2022: Bipartisan Safer Communities Act, 
 August 9, 2022: CHIPS and Science Act, 
 August 10, 2022: Honoring Our PACT Act of 2022, 
 August 16, 2022: Inflation Reduction Act of 2022, 
 December 2, 2022: Medical Marijuana and Cannabidiol Research Expansion Act, 
 December 7, 2022: Speak Out Act, 
 December 13, 2022: Respect for Marriage Act, 
 December 23, 2022: James M. Inhofe National Defense Authorization Act for Fiscal Year 2023,  
 December 29, 2022: Consolidated Appropriations Act, 2023 (including the Electoral Count Reform and Presidential Transition Improvement Act of 2022, Pregnant Workers Fairness Act, State Antitrust Enforcement Venue Act, Merger Filing Fee Modernization Act, and No TikTok on Government Devices Act), 
 January 5, 2023: Sami's Law, 
 January 5, 2023: National Heritage Area Act,

Proposed (but not enacted) 

 House bills
: For the People Act of 2021 (passed the House, but the Senate took no action)
: John R. Lewis Voting Rights Advancement Act of 2021 (passed the House, but the Senate took no action)
: Equality Act of 2021 (passed the House, but the Senate took no action)
: American Dream and Promise Act of 2021 (passed the House, but the Senate took no action)
: Paycheck Fairness Act of 2021 (Senate failed to invoke cloture on the bill by a vote taken on June 8, 2021)
: Bipartisan Background Checks Act of 2021 (passed the House; replaced with Bipartisan Safer Communities Act which was enacted)
: Commission to Study and Develop Reparation Proposals for African-Americans Act
: Washington, D.C. Admission Act of 2021 (passed the House, but the Senate took no action)
: Social Security Fairness Act of 2021
: Federal Death Penalty Abolition Act of 2021
: Sabika Sheikh Firearm Licensing and Registration Act of 2021
: Repeal of the Authorization for Use of Military Force Against Iraq Resolution of 2002 (passed the House, but the Senate took no action)
: Raise the Wage Act of 2021
: FAMILY Act of 2021
: Protecting the Right to Organize Act of 2021 (passed the House, but the Senate took no action)
: FAIR Act of 2022
: U.S. Citizenship Act of 2021
: Workplace Violence Prevention for Health Care and Social Service Workers Act (passed the House, but the Senate took no action)
: George Floyd Justice in Policing Act of 2021
: NO BAN Act (passed the House, but the Senate took no action)
: Enhanced Background Checks Act of 2021 (passed the House; replaced with Bipartisan Safer Communities Act which was enacted)
: Puerto Rico Statehood Admission Act of 2021
: Farm Workforce Modernization Act of 2021 (passed the House, but the Senate took no action)
: Eliminating a Quantifiably Unjust Application of the Law (EQUAL) Act of 2021 (passed the House, but the Senate took no action)
: Assault Weapons Ban of 2022 (passed the House, but the Senate took no action)
: Ensuring Lasting Smiles Act (passed the House, but the Senate took no action)
: To establish an improved Medicare for All national health insurance program.
: SAFE Banking Act of 2021 (passed the House, but the Senate took no action)
: CROWN Act of 2022 (passed the House, but the Senate took no action)
: Recovering America's Wildlife Act (passed the House, but the Senate took no action)
: National Commission to Investigate the January 6 Attack on the United States Capitol Complex Act (Senate failed to invoke cloture on the bill by a vote taken on May 28, 2021)
: MORE Act of 2021 (passed the House, but the Senate took no action)
: ACCESS Act
: Local Journalism Sustainability Act
: Averting Loss of Life and Injury by Expediting SIVs (ALLIES) Act of 2021 (passed the House, but the Senate took no action)
: America COMPETES Act of 2022 (incorporated into the CHIPS and Science Act)
: Puerto Rico Status Act (passed the House, but the Senate took no action)
: Presidential Election Reform Act (passed the House, but the Senate took no action)

 Senate bills
: See Something, Say Something Online Act of 2021
: Raise the Wage Act of 2021
: Sunshine Protection Act of 2021 (passed the Senate, but the House took no action)
: Ensuring Lasting Smiles Act
: Social Security Fairness Act of 2021
: U.S. Innovation and Competition Act (passed the House; incorporated into the CHIPS and Science Act)
: Future of Local News Act
: Open App Markets Act
: Freedom to Vote Act (Senate failed to invoke cloture on a motion to proceed to the bill by vote held on January 19, 2022)
: American Innovation and Choice Online Act
: EARN IT Act
: Women's Health Protection Act (Senate failed to invoke cloture on a motion to proceed to the bill by vote held on May 11, 2022)
: DISCLOSE Act (Senate failed to invoke cloture on a motion to proceed to the bill by vote held on August 22, 2022)

Major resolutions

Adopted 
: Calling on Vice President Michael R. Pence to convene and mobilize the principal officers of the executive departments of the Cabinet to activate section 4 of the 25th Amendment to declare President Donald J. Trump incapable of executing the duties of his office and to immediately exercise powers as acting president.
 (Second impeachment of Donald Trump): Impeaching Donald John Trump, President of the United States, for high crimes and misdemeanors.
: A resolution honoring the memory of Officer Brian David Sicknick of the United States Capitol Police for his selfless acts of heroism on the grounds of the United States Capitol on January 6, 2021.
 (Removal of Representative Marjorie Taylor Greene from committee assignments): Removing a certain Member from certain standing committees of the House of Representatives
: Condemning the 2021 Myanmar coup d'état.
: Censuring Representative Paul Gosar.
: To provide for a resolution with respect to the unresolved disputes between certain railroads represented by the National Carriers' Conference Committee of the National Railway Labor Conference and certain of their employees.

Proposed 
: Censuring and condemning President Donald J. Trump for attempting to overturn the results of the November 2020 presidential election in the State of Georgia
: Removing the deadline for the ratification of the equal rights amendment.
: Directing the Committee on Ethics to investigate, and issue a report on, whether any and all actions taken by Members of the 117th Congress who sought to overturn the 2020 Presidential election violated their oath of office to uphold the Constitution or the Rules of the House of Representatives, and should face sanction, including removal from the House of Representatives. 
: Recognizing the duty of the Federal Government to create a Green New Deal.

Party summary
 Resignations and new members are discussed in the "Changes in membership" section below.

Senate

Senate membership

House of Representatives

Leadership
Note: Democrats refer to themselves as a "Caucus"; Republicans refer to themselves as a "Conference".

Senate leadership

Presiding
 President of the Senate: Mike Pence (R), until January 20, 2021
Kamala Harris (D), from January 20, 2021
 President pro tempore: Chuck Grassley (R), until January 20, 2021
Patrick Leahy (D), from January 20, 2021

Democratic leadership

 Senate Majority Leader since January 20, 2021: Chuck Schumer
 Senate Majority Whip since January 20, 2021: Dick Durbin
 Senate Assistant Democratic Leader: Patty Murray
 Chair of the Senate Democratic Policy and Communications Committee: Debbie Stabenow
 Vice Chairs of the Senate Democratic Caucus: Mark Warner and Elizabeth Warren
 Chair of the Senate Democratic Steering and Outreach Committee: Amy Klobuchar
 Chair of Senate Democratic Outreach: Bernie Sanders
 Vice Chairs of the Senate Democratic Policy and Communications Committee: Cory Booker and Joe Manchin
 Secretary of the Senate Democratic Caucus: Tammy Baldwin
 Chair of the Democratic Senatorial Campaign Committee: Gary Peters
 Vice Chair of Senate Democratic Outreach: Catherine Cortez Masto
 President pro tempore emeritus: Patrick Leahy (D), until January 20, 2021

Republican leadership

 Senate Minority Leader: Mitch McConnell
 Senate Minority Whip: John Thune
 Chair of the Senate Republican Conference: John Barrasso
 Chair of the Senate Republican Policy Committee: Roy Blunt
 Chair of the Senate Republican Steering Committee: Mike Lee
 Vice Chair of the Senate Republican Conference: Joni Ernst
 Chair of the National Republican Senatorial Committee: Rick Scott
 President pro tempore emeritus: Chuck Grassley (R), since January 20, 2021

House leadership

Presiding

 Speaker: Nancy Pelosi (D)

Majority (Democratic) leadership
 House Majority Leader: Steny Hoyer
 House Majority Whip: Jim Clyburn
 Assistant Speaker of the House: Katherine Clark
 Chair of the House Democratic Caucus: Hakeem Jeffries
 Vice Chair of the House Democratic Caucus: Pete Aguilar
 Chair of the Democratic Congressional Campaign Committee: Sean Patrick Maloney
 Co-Chairs of the House Democratic Policy and Communications Committee: Matt Cartwright, Debbie Dingell, Ted Lieu, and Joe Neguse
 House Democratic Junior Caucus Leadership Representative: Colin Allred
 House Democratic Freshman Class Leadership Representative: Mondaire Jones
 Co-Chairs of the House Democratic Steering and Policy Committee: Cheri Bustos, Barbara Lee, and Eric Swalwell
 House Democratic Senior Chief Deputy Whips: G. K. Butterfield and Jan Schakowsky
 House Democratic Chief Deputy Whips: Henry Cuellar, Sheila Jackson Lee, Dan Kildee, Stephanie Murphy, Jimmy Panetta, Terri Sewell, Debbie Wasserman Schultz, and Peter Welch

Minority (Republican) leadership
 House Minority Leader and Chair of the House Republican Steering Committee: Kevin McCarthy
 House Minority Whip: Steve Scalise
 Chair of the House Republican Conference: Liz Cheney (until May 12, 2021)
Elise Stefanik (since May 14, 2021)
 Vice Chair of the House Republican Conference: Mike Johnson
 Secretary of the House Republican Conference: Rich Hudson
 Chair of the House Republican Policy Committee: Gary Palmer
 Chair of the National Republican Congressional Committee: Tom Emmer

Members

Senate members

The numbers refer to their Senate classes. All class 1 senators are in the middle of their term (2019–2025), having been elected in 2018 and facing re-election in 2024. Class 2 senators are at the beginning of their term (2021–2027), having been elected in 2020 and facing re-election in 2026. Class 3 senators are at the end of their term (2017–2023), having been elected in 2016 and facing re-election in 2022.

Alabama 
 2. Tommy Tuberville (R)
 3. Richard Shelby (R)

Alaska 
 2. Dan Sullivan (R)
 3. Lisa Murkowski (R)

Arizona 
 1. Kyrsten Sinema (D)
 3. Mark Kelly (D)

Arkansas 
 2. Tom Cotton (R)
 3. John Boozman (R)

California 
 1. Dianne Feinstein (D)
 3. Kamala Harris (D) 
 Alex Padilla (D)

Colorado 
 2. John Hickenlooper (D)
 3. Michael Bennet (D)

Connecticut 
 1. Chris Murphy (D)
 3. Richard Blumenthal (D)

Delaware 
 1. Tom Carper (D)
 2. Chris Coons (D)

Florida 
 1. Rick Scott (R)
 3. Marco Rubio (R)

Georgia 
 2. Jon Ossoff (D) 
 3. Kelly Loeffler (R) 
 Raphael Warnock (D)

Hawaii 
 1. Mazie Hirono (D)
 3. Brian Schatz (D)

Idaho 
 2. Jim Risch (R)
 3. Mike Crapo (R)

Illinois 
 2. Dick Durbin (D)
 3. Tammy Duckworth (D)

Indiana 
 1. Mike Braun (R)
 3. Todd Young (R)

Iowa 
 2. Joni Ernst (R)
 3. Chuck Grassley (R)

Kansas 
 2. Roger Marshall (R)
 3. Jerry Moran (R)

Kentucky 
 2. Mitch McConnell (R)
 3. Rand Paul (R)

Louisiana 
 2. Bill Cassidy (R)
 3. John Kennedy (R)

Maine 
 1. Angus King (I)
 2. Susan Collins (R)

Maryland 
 1. Ben Cardin (D)
 3. Chris Van Hollen (D)

Massachusetts 
 1. Elizabeth Warren (D)
 2. Ed Markey (D)

Michigan 
 1. Debbie Stabenow (D)
 2. Gary Peters (D)

Minnesota 
 1. Amy Klobuchar (DFL)
 2. Tina Smith (DFL)

Mississippi 
 1. Roger Wicker (R)
 2. Cindy Hyde-Smith (R)

Missouri 
 1. Josh Hawley (R)
 3. Roy Blunt (R)

Montana 
 1. Jon Tester (D)
 2. Steve Daines (R)

Nebraska 
 1. Deb Fischer (R)
 2. Ben Sasse (R)

Nevada 
 1. Jacky Rosen (D)
 3. Catherine Cortez Masto (D)

New Hampshire 
 2. Jeanne Shaheen (D)
 3. Maggie Hassan (D)

New Jersey 
 1. Bob Menendez (D)
 2. Cory Booker (D)

New Mexico 
 1. Martin Heinrich (D)
 2. Ben Ray Luján (D)

New York 
 1. Kirsten Gillibrand (D)
 3. Chuck Schumer (D)

North Carolina 
 2. Thom Tillis (R)
 3. Richard Burr (R)

North Dakota 
 1. Kevin Cramer (R)
 3. John Hoeven (R)

Ohio 
 1. Sherrod Brown (D)
 3. Rob Portman (R)

Oklahoma 
 2. Jim Inhofe (R)
 3. James Lankford (R)

Oregon 
 2. Jeff Merkley (D)
 3. Ron Wyden (D)

Pennsylvania 
 1. Bob Casey Jr. (D)
 3. Pat Toomey (R)

Rhode Island 
 1. Sheldon Whitehouse (D)
 2. Jack Reed (D)

South Carolina 
 2. Lindsey Graham (R)
 3. Tim Scott (R)

South Dakota 
 2. Mike Rounds (R)
 3. John Thune (R)

Tennessee 
 1. Marsha Blackburn (R)
 2. Bill Hagerty (R)

Texas 
 1. Ted Cruz (R)
 2. John Cornyn (R)

Utah 
 1. Mitt Romney (R)
 3. Mike Lee (R)

Vermont 
 1. Bernie Sanders (I)
 3. Patrick Leahy (D)

Virginia 
 1. Tim Kaine (D)
 2. Mark Warner (D)

Washington 
 1. Maria Cantwell (D)
 3. Patty Murray (D)

West Virginia 
 1. Joe Manchin (D)
 2. Shelley Moore Capito (R)

Wisconsin 
 1. Tammy Baldwin (D)
 3. Ron Johnson (R)

Wyoming 
 1. John Barrasso (R)
 2. Cynthia Lummis (R)

House members
All 435 seats for voting members, along with the six non-voting delegates were filled by election in November 2020.

Alabama
 . Jerry Carl (R)
 . Barry Moore (R)
 . Mike Rogers (R)
 . Robert Aderholt (R)
 . Mo Brooks (R)
 . Gary Palmer (R)
 . Terri Sewell (D)

Alaska
 . Don Young (R) 
 Mary Peltola (D)

Arizona
 . Tom O'Halleran (D)
 . Ann Kirkpatrick (D)
 . Raúl Grijalva (D)
 . Paul Gosar (R)
 . Andy Biggs (R)
 . David Schweikert (R)
 . Ruben Gallego (D)
 . Debbie Lesko (R)
 . Greg Stanton (D)

Arkansas
 . Rick Crawford (R)
 . French Hill (R)
 . Steve Womack (R)
 . Bruce Westerman (R)

California
 . Doug LaMalfa (R)
 . Jared Huffman (D)
 . John Garamendi (D)
 . Tom McClintock (R)
 . Mike Thompson (D)
 . Doris Matsui (D)
 . Ami Bera (D)
 . Jay Obernolte (R)
 . Jerry McNerney (D)
 . Josh Harder (D)
 . Mark DeSaulnier (D)
 . Nancy Pelosi (D)
 . Barbara Lee (D)
 . Jackie Speier (D)
 . Eric Swalwell (D)
 . Jim Costa (D)
 . Ro Khanna (D)
 . Anna Eshoo (D)
 . Zoe Lofgren (D)
 . Jimmy Panetta (D)
 . David Valadao (R)
 . Devin Nunes (R) 
 Connie Conway 
 . Kevin McCarthy (R)
 . Salud Carbajal (D)
 . Mike Garcia (R)
 . Julia Brownley (D)
 . Judy Chu (D)
 . Adam Schiff (D)
 . Tony Cárdenas (D)
 . Brad Sherman (D)
 . Pete Aguilar (D)
 . Grace Napolitano (D)
 . Ted Lieu (D)
 . Jimmy Gomez (D)
 . Norma Torres (D)
 . Raul Ruiz (D)
 . Karen Bass (D) 
 . Linda Sánchez (D)
 . Young Kim (R)
 . Lucille Roybal-Allard (D)
 . Mark Takano (D)
 . Ken Calvert (R)
 . Maxine Waters (D)
 . Nanette Barragán (D)
 . Katie Porter (D)
 . Lou Correa (D)
 . Alan Lowenthal (D)
 . Michelle Steel (R)
 . Mike Levin (D)
 . Darrell Issa (R)
 . Juan Vargas (D)
 . Scott Peters (D)
 . Sara Jacobs (D)

Colorado
 . Diana DeGette (D)
 . Joe Neguse (D)
 . Lauren Boebert (R)
 . Ken Buck (R)
 . Doug Lamborn (R)
 . Jason Crow (D)
 . Ed Perlmutter (D)

Connecticut
 . John B. Larson (D)
 . Joe Courtney (D)
 . Rosa DeLauro (D)
 . Jim Himes (D)
 . Jahana Hayes (D)

Delaware
 . Lisa Blunt Rochester (D)

Florida
 . Matt Gaetz (R)
 . Neal Dunn (R)
 . Kat Cammack (R)
 . John Rutherford (R)
 . Al Lawson (D)
 . Michael Waltz (R)
 . Stephanie Murphy (D)
 . Bill Posey (R)
 . Darren Soto (D)
 . Val Demings (D)
 . Daniel Webster (R)
 . Gus Bilirakis (R)
 . Charlie Crist (D) 
 . Kathy Castor (D)
 . Scott Franklin (R)
 . Vern Buchanan (R)
 . Greg Steube (R)
 . Brian Mast (R)
 . Byron Donalds (R)
 . Alcee Hastings (D) 
 Sheila Cherfilus-McCormick (D) 
 . Lois Frankel (D)
 . Ted Deutch (D) 
 . Debbie Wasserman Schultz (D)
 . Frederica Wilson (D)
 . Mario Díaz-Balart (R)
 . Carlos A. Giménez (R)
 . María Elvira Salazar (R)

Georgia
 . Buddy Carter (R)
 . Sanford Bishop (D)
 . Drew Ferguson (R)
 . Hank Johnson (D)
 . Nikema Williams (D)
 . Lucy McBath (D)
 . Carolyn Bourdeaux (D)
 . Austin Scott (R)
 . Andrew Clyde (R)
 . Jody Hice (R)
 . Barry Loudermilk (R)
 . Rick W. Allen (R)
 . David Scott (D)
 . Marjorie Taylor Greene (R)

Hawaii
 . Ed Case (D)
 . Kai Kahele (D)

Idaho
 . Russ Fulcher (R)
 . Mike Simpson (R)

Illinois
 . Bobby Rush (D)
 . Robin Kelly (D)
 . Marie Newman (D)
 . Chuy García (D)
 . Mike Quigley (D)
 . Sean Casten (D)
 . Danny K. Davis (D)
 . Raja Krishnamoorthi (D)
 . Jan Schakowsky (D)
 . Brad Schneider (D)
 . Bill Foster (D)
 . Mike Bost (R)
 . Rodney Davis (R)
 . Lauren Underwood (D)
 . Mary Miller (R)
 . Adam Kinzinger (R)
 . Cheri Bustos (D)
 . Darin LaHood (R)

Indiana
 . Frank J. Mrvan (D)
 . Jackie Walorski (R) 
 Rudy Yakym (R) 
 . Jim Banks (R)
 . Jim Baird (R)
 . Victoria Spartz (R)
 . Greg Pence (R)
 . André Carson (D)
 . Larry Bucshon (R)
 . Trey Hollingsworth (R)

Iowa
 . Ashley Hinson (R)
 . Mariannette Miller-Meeks (R)
 . Cindy Axne (D)
 . Randy Feenstra (R)

Kansas
 . Tracey Mann (R)
 . Jake LaTurner (R)
 . Sharice Davids (D)
 . Ron Estes (R)

Kentucky
 . James Comer (R)
 . Brett Guthrie (R)
 . John Yarmuth (D)
 . Thomas Massie (R)
 . Hal Rogers (R)
 . Andy Barr (R)

Louisiana
 . Steve Scalise (R)
 . Cedric Richmond (D) 
 Troy Carter (D) 
 . Clay Higgins (R)
 . Mike Johnson (R)
 . Julia Letlow (R) 
 . Garret Graves (R)

Maine
 . Chellie Pingree (D)
 . Jared Golden (D)

Maryland
 . Andy Harris (R)
 . Dutch Ruppersberger (D)
 . John Sarbanes (D)
 . Anthony Brown (D)
 . Steny Hoyer (D)
 . David Trone (D)
 . Kweisi Mfume (D)
 . Jamie Raskin (D)

Massachusetts
 . Richard Neal (D)
 . Jim McGovern (D)
 . Lori Trahan (D)
 . Jake Auchincloss (D)
 . Katherine Clark (D)
 . Seth Moulton (D)
 . Ayanna Pressley (D)
 . Stephen F. Lynch (D)
 . Bill Keating (D)

Michigan
 . Jack Bergman (R)
 . Bill Huizenga (R)
 . Peter Meijer (R)
 . John Moolenaar (R)
 . Dan Kildee (D)
 . Fred Upton (R)
 . Tim Walberg (R)
 . Elissa Slotkin (D)
 . Andy Levin (D)
 . Lisa McClain (R)
 . Haley Stevens (D)
 . Debbie Dingell (D)
 . Rashida Tlaib (D)
 . Brenda Lawrence (D)

Minnesota
 . Jim Hagedorn (R) 
 Brad Finstad (R) 
 . Angie Craig (DFL)
 . Dean Phillips (DFL)
 . Betty McCollum (DFL)
 . Ilhan Omar (DFL)
 . Tom Emmer (R)
 . Michelle Fischbach (R)
 . Pete Stauber (R)

Mississippi
 . Trent Kelly (R)
 . Bennie Thompson (D)
 . Michael Guest (R)
 . Steven Palazzo (R)

Missouri
 . Cori Bush (D)
 . Ann Wagner (R)
 . Blaine Luetkemeyer (R)
 . Vicky Hartzler (R)
 . Emanuel Cleaver (D)
 . Sam Graves (R)
 . Billy Long (R)
 . Jason Smith (R)

Montana
 . Matt Rosendale (R)

Nebraska
 . Jeff Fortenberry (R) 
 Mike Flood (R) 
 . Don Bacon (R)
 . Adrian Smith (R)

Nevada
 . Dina Titus (D)
 . Mark Amodei (R)
 . Susie Lee (D)
 . Steven Horsford (D)

New Hampshire
 . Chris Pappas (D)
 . Annie Kuster (D)

New Jersey
 . Donald Norcross (D)
 . Jeff Van Drew (R)
 . Andy Kim (D)
 . Chris Smith (R)
 . Josh Gottheimer (D)
 . Frank Pallone (D)
 . Tom Malinowski (D)
 . Albio Sires (D)
 . Bill Pascrell (D)
 . Donald Payne Jr. (D)
 . Mikie Sherrill (D)
 . Bonnie Watson Coleman (D)

New Mexico
 . Deb Haaland (D) 
 Melanie Stansbury (D) 
 . Yvette Herrell (R)
 . Teresa Leger Fernandez (D)

New York
 . Lee Zeldin (R)
 . Andrew Garbarino (R)
 . Thomas Suozzi (D)
 . Kathleen Rice (D)
 . Gregory Meeks (D)
 . Grace Meng (D)
 . Nydia Velázquez (D)
 . Hakeem Jeffries (D)
 . Yvette Clarke (D)
 . Jerry Nadler (D)
 . Nicole Malliotakis (R)
 . Carolyn Maloney (D)
 . Adriano Espaillat (D)
 . Alexandria Ocasio-Cortez (D)
 . Ritchie Torres (D)
 . Jamaal Bowman (D)
 . Mondaire Jones (D)
 . Sean Patrick Maloney (D)
 . Antonio Delgado (D) 
  Pat Ryan (D) 
 . Paul Tonko (D)
 . Elise Stefanik (R)
 . Claudia Tenney (R) 
 . Tom Reed (R) 
 Joe Sempolinski (R) 
 . John Katko (R)
 . Joseph Morelle (D)
 . Brian Higgins (D)
 . Chris Jacobs (R)

North Carolina
 . G. K. Butterfield (D) 
 . Deborah K. Ross (D)
 . Greg Murphy (R)
 . David Price (D)
 . Virginia Foxx (R)
 . Kathy Manning (D)
 . David Rouzer (R)
 . Richard Hudson (R)
 . Dan Bishop (R)
 . Patrick McHenry (R)
 . Madison Cawthorn (R)
 . Alma Adams (D)
 . Ted Budd (R)

North Dakota
 . Kelly Armstrong (R)

Ohio
 . Steve Chabot (R)
 . Brad Wenstrup (R)
 . Joyce Beatty (D)
 . Jim Jordan (R)
 . Bob Latta (R)
 . Bill Johnson (R)
 . Bob Gibbs (R)
 . Warren Davidson (R)
 . Marcy Kaptur (D)
 . Mike Turner (R)
 . Marcia Fudge (D) 
 Shontel Brown (D) 
 . Troy Balderson (R)
 . Tim Ryan (D)
 . David Joyce (R)
 . Steve Stivers (R) 
 Mike Carey (R) 
 . Anthony Gonzalez (R)

Oklahoma
 . Kevin Hern (R)
 . Markwayne Mullin (R)
 . Frank Lucas (R)
 . Tom Cole (R)
 . Stephanie Bice (R)

Oregon
 . Suzanne Bonamici (D)
 . Cliff Bentz (R)
 . Earl Blumenauer (D)
 . Peter DeFazio (D)
 . Kurt Schrader (D)

Pennsylvania
 . Brian Fitzpatrick (R)
 . Brendan Boyle (D)
 . Dwight Evans (D)
 . Madeleine Dean (D)
 . Mary Gay Scanlon (D)
 . Chrissy Houlahan (D)
 . Susan Wild (D)
 . Matt Cartwright (D)
 . Dan Meuser (R)
 . Scott Perry (R)
 . Lloyd Smucker (R)
 . Fred Keller (R)
 . John Joyce (R)
 . Guy Reschenthaler (R)
 . Glenn Thompson (R)
 . Mike Kelly (R)
 . Conor Lamb (D)
 . Mike Doyle (D)

Rhode Island
 . David Cicilline (D)
 . James Langevin (D)

South Carolina
 . Nancy Mace (R)
 . Joe Wilson (R)
 . Jeff Duncan (R)
 . William Timmons (R)
 . Ralph Norman (R)
 . Jim Clyburn (D)
 . Tom Rice (R)

South Dakota
 . Dusty Johnson (R)

Tennessee
 . Diana Harshbarger (R)
 . Tim Burchett (R)
 . Chuck Fleischmann (R)
 . Scott DesJarlais (R)
 . Jim Cooper (D)
 . John Rose (R)
 . Mark E. Green (R)
 . David Kustoff (R)
 . Steve Cohen (D)

Texas
 . Louie Gohmert (R)
 . Dan Crenshaw (R)
 . Van Taylor (R)
 . Pat Fallon (R)
 . Lance Gooden (R)
 . Ron Wright (R) 
 Jake Ellzey (R) 
 . Lizzie Fletcher (D)
 . Kevin Brady (R)
 . Al Green (D)
 . Michael McCaul (R)
 . August Pfluger (R)
 . Kay Granger (R)
 . Ronny Jackson (R)
 . Randy Weber (R)
 . Vicente Gonzalez (D)
 . Veronica Escobar (D)
 . Pete Sessions (R)
 . Sheila Jackson Lee (D)
 . Jodey Arrington (R)
 . Joaquin Castro (D)
 . Chip Roy (R)
 . Troy Nehls (R)
 . Tony Gonzales (R)
 . Beth Van Duyne (R)
 . Roger Williams (R)
 . Michael C. Burgess (R)
 . Michael Cloud (R)
 . Henry Cuellar (D)
 . Sylvia Garcia (D)
 . Eddie Bernice Johnson (D)
 . John Carter (R)
 . Colin Allred (D)
 . Marc Veasey (D)
 . Filemon Vela Jr. (D) 
 Mayra Flores (R) 
 . Lloyd Doggett (D)
 . Brian Babin (R)

Utah
 . Blake Moore (R)
 . Chris Stewart (R)
 . John Curtis (R)
 . Burgess Owens (R)

Vermont
 . Peter Welch (D)

Virginia
 . Rob Wittman (R)
 . Elaine Luria (D)
 . Bobby Scott (D)
 . Donald McEachin (D) 
 . Bob Good (R)
 . Ben Cline (R)
 . Abigail Spanberger (D)
 . Don Beyer (D)
 . Morgan Griffith (R)
 . Jennifer Wexton (D)
 . Gerry Connolly (D)

Washington
 . Suzan DelBene (D)
 . Rick Larsen (D)
 . Jaime Herrera Beutler (R)
 . Dan Newhouse (R)
 . Cathy McMorris Rodgers (R)
 . Derek Kilmer (D)
 . Pramila Jayapal (D)
 . Kim Schrier (D)
 . Adam Smith (D)
 . Marilyn Strickland (D)

West Virginia
 . David McKinley (R)
 . Alex Mooney (R)
 . Carol Miller (R)

Wisconsin
 . Bryan Steil (R)
 . Mark Pocan (D)
 . Ron Kind (D)
 . Gwen Moore (D)
 . Scott L. Fitzgerald (R)
 . Glenn Grothman (R)
 . Tom Tiffany (R)
 . Mike Gallagher (R)

Wyoming
 . Liz Cheney (R)

Non-voting members
 . Amata Coleman Radewagen (R)
 . Eleanor Holmes Norton (D)
 . Michael San Nicolas (D)
 . Gregorio Sablan (D)
 . Jenniffer González (R-PNP)
 . Stacey Plaskett (D)

Changes in membership

|-
! Georgia(2)
| data-sort-value="Aaaaa" | Vacant
| data-sort-value="January 5, 2021" | David Perdue's (R) term expired January 3, 2021, before a runoff election could be held.Successor elected January 5, 2021.
|  | (D)
| January 20, 2021

|-
! California(3)
|  | (D)
| data-sort-value="January 20, 2021" | Incumbent resigned on January 18, 2021, to become U.S. Vice President.Successor appointed January 20, 2021, to complete the term that will end January 3, 2023, and later elected to finish in the final weeks of the Congress and a full six-year term.
|  | (D)
| January 20, 2021

|-
! Georgia(3)
|  | (R)
| data-sort-value="January 20, 2021" | Appointee lost election to finish the term.Successor elected January 5, 2021, for the remainder of the term that will end January 3, 2023.
|  | (D)
| January 20, 2021

|}

|-
! 
| data-sort-value="Aaaaa" | Vacant
| data-sort-value="January 3, 2021" | Anthony Brindisi's (D) term expired January 3, 2021, and the seat remained vacant due to the result of the 2020 election being disputed. On February 5, 2021, a judge declared a winner.
| nowrap  | Claudia Tenney(R)
| February 11, 2021

|-
! 
| data-sort-value="Aaaaa" | Vacant
| data-sort-value="January 3, 2021" | Member-elect Luke Letlow (R) died from COVID-19 on December 29, 2020, before his term started.A special election was held on March 20, 2021.
| nowrap  | Julia Letlow(R)
| April 14, 2021

|-
! 
| nowrap  | (D)
| data-sort-value="January 15, 2021" | Resigned January 15, 2021, to become Senior Advisor to the President and director of the Office of Public Liaison.A special election was held on March 20, 2021, and a runoff was held on April 24.
| nowrap  |Troy Carter(D)
| May 11, 2021

|-
! 
|  | Ron Wright(R)
| data-sort-value="February 7, 2021" | Died from COVID-19 on February 7, 2021.A special election was held on May 1, 2021, and a runoff was held on July 27.
|  |(R)
| July 30, 2021

|-
! 
| nowrap  | (D)
| data-sort-value="January 2021" | Resigned March 10, 2021, to become U.S. Secretary of Housing and Urban Development.A special election was held on November 2, 2021.
| nowrap  |Shontel Brown(D)
| November 4, 2021

|-
! 
| nowrap  | (D)
| data-sort-value="January 2021" | Resigned March 16, 2021, to become U.S. Secretary of the Interior.A special election was held on June 1, 2021.
| nowrap  |Melanie Stansbury(D)
| June 14, 2021

|-
! 
| nowrap  | (D)
| data-sort-value="April 2021" | Died from pancreatic cancer on April 6, 2021.A special election was held on January 11, 2022.
| nowrap  |Sheila Cherfilus-McCormick(D)
| January 18, 2022

|-
! 
| nowrap  | (R)
| data-sort-value="May 2021" | Resigned May 16, 2021, to become the president and CEO of the Ohio Chamber of Commerce.A special election was held on November 2, 2021.
|  |Mike Carey(R)
| November 4, 2021

|-
! 
| nowrap  | (R)
| data-sort-value="December 2021" | Resigned January 1, 2022, to become the CEO of Trump Media & Technology Group.A special election was held on June 7, 2022.
|  |Connie Conway(R)
| June 14, 2022

|-
! 
| nowrap  | (R)
| data-sort-value="February 2022" | Died from kidney cancer on February 17, 2022. A special election was held on August 9, 2022.
|  |Brad Finstad(R)
| August 12, 2022

|-
! 
| nowrap  | (R)
| data-sort-value="March 2022" | Died on March 18, 2022.A special election was held on August 16, 2022.
|  |Mary Peltola(D)
| September 13, 2022

|-
! 
| nowrap  | (R)
| data-sort-value="March 2022" | Resigned March 31, 2022, due to criminal conviction.A special election was held on June 28, 2022.
|  |Mike Flood(R)
| July 12, 2022

|-
! 
| nowrap  | (D)
| data-sort-value="November 2022" | Resigned March 31, 2022, to join Akin Gump Strauss Hauer & Feld.A special election was held on June 14, 2022.
|  |Mayra Flores(R)
| June 21, 2022

|-
! 
| nowrap  | (R)
| data-sort-value="May 2022" | Resigned May 10, 2022, to join Prime Policy Group.A special election was held on August 23, 2022.
|  | Joe Sempolinski(R)
| September 13, 2022

|- 
! 
| nowrap  | (D)
| data-sort-value="May 2022" | Resigned May 25, 2022, to become lieutenant governor of New York.A special election was held on August 23, 2022.
|  | Pat Ryan(D)
| September 13, 2022

|-
! 
|  | Jackie Walorski(R)
| data-sort-value="August 2022" | Died in a car collision on August 3, 2022.A special election was held on November 8, 2022.
|  | Rudy Yakym(R)
| November 14, 2022

|- 
! 
| nowrap  | (D)
| data-sort-value="August 2022" | Resigned August 31, 2022, to focus on the 2022 Florida gubernatorial election.
| colspan=2 align=center | Vacant until the next Congress

|- 
! 
| nowrap  | (D)
| data-sort-value="September 2022" | Resigned September 30, 2022, to become CEO of the American Jewish Committee.
| colspan=2 align=center | Vacant until the next Congress

|- 
! 
| nowrap  | (D)
| data-sort-value="November 2022" | Died November 28, 2022, from colorectal cancer.
| colspan=2 align=center | Vacant until the next Congress

|- 
! 
| nowrap  | (D)
| data-sort-value="December 2022" | Resigned December 9, 2022, to become the Mayor of Los Angeles.
| colspan=2 align=center | Vacant until the next Congress

|- 
! 
| nowrap  | (D)
| data-sort-value="December 2022" | Resigned December 30, 2022, to accept a lobbying position.
| colspan=2 align=center | Vacant until the next Congress

|- 
! 
| nowrap  | (D)
| data-sort-value="December 2022" | Resigned December 31, 2022, to join K&L Gates.
| colspan=2 align=center | Vacant until the next Congress
|}

Committees 
Section contents: Senate, House, Joint

Senate committees

House committees

Joint committees

Officers and officials

Senate officers and officials
 Chaplain: Barry Black (Seventh-day Adventist)
 Curator: Melinda Smith
 Historian: Betty Koed
 Librarian: Leona I. Faust
 Parliamentarian: Elizabeth MacDonough
 Secretary:
 Julie E. Adams until March 1, 2021
 Sonceria Berry from March 1, 2021
 Sergeant at Arms and Doorkeeper:
 Michael C. Stenger, until January 7, 2021
 Jennifer Hemingway, from January 7 to March 22, 2021 (acting)
 Lt. Gen. Karen Gibson since March 22, 2021
 Deputy Sergeant at Arms and Doorkeeper: Kelly Fado, since March 22, 2021

House officers and officials
 Chaplain: Margaret G. Kibben (Presbyterian)
 Chief Administrative Officer: Catherine Szpindor
 Clerk: Cheryl L. Johnson
 Historian: Matthew Wasniewski
 Parliamentarian: Jason Smith
 Reading Clerks: Tylease Alli (D) and Susan Cole (R)
 Sergeant at Arms:
 Paul D. Irving, until January 7, 2021
 Timothy P. Blodgett, January 12, 2021 – March 26, 2021 (acting)
 William J. Walker, starting April 26, 2021

Legislative branch agency directors
 Architect of the Capitol: Brett Blanton
 Attending Physician: Brian P. Monahan
 Comptroller General of the United States: Gene Dodaro
 Director of the Congressional Budget Office: Phillip Swagel
 Librarian of Congress: Carla Diane Hayden
 Director of the U.S. Government Publishing Office: Vacant
 Counselor of the Office of the Law Revision Counsel: Ralph V. Seep
 Counselor of the Office of House Legislative Counsel: Ernest Wade Ballou Jr.
 Public Printer of the United States: Hugh N. Halpern

See also
 List of new members of the 117th United States Congress
 2020 United States elections (elections leading to this Congress)
 2020 United States presidential election
 2020 United States Senate elections
 2020 United States House of Representatives elections
 2021 United States elections (elections during this Congress)
 2021 United States House of Representatives elections
 2022 United States elections (elections during this Congress, leading to the next Congress)
 2022 United States Senate elections
 2022 United States House of Representatives elections

Notes

External links 
Videos of House of Representatives Sessions for the 117th Congress from C-SPAN
Videos of Senate Sessions for the 117th Congress from C-SPAN
Videos of Committees from the House and Senate for the 117th Congress C-SPAN
Congressional Pictorial Directory for the 117th Congress
Official Congressional Directory for the 117th Congress

References